The 2014 Ukrainian Amateur Cup was the nineteenth annual season of Ukraine's football knockout competition for amateur football teams. The competition started on 13 August 2014 and concluded on 9 November 2014.

The cup holders Chaika Petropavlivska Borshchahivka did not participate, but finalist FC Yednist Plysky were defeated by FC Kolos Kovalivka in quarterfinals.

Participated clubs

 Cherkasy Oblast: Zorya Biloziria
 Chernihiv Oblast: Yednist Plysky
 Chernivtsi Oblast: Zarinok Tysovets
 Dnipropetrovsk Oblast (2): VPK-Ahro Shevchenkivka, Olimpik Petrykivka
 Kharkiv Oblast: Kolos Zachepylivka
 Kherson Oblast: Myr Hornostaivka
 Khmelnytskyi Oblast: Zbruch Volochysk
 Kirovohrad Oblast: AF Pyatykhatska Volodymyrivka

 Kyiv and Kyiv Oblast (3): Arsenal-Kyiv Kyiv, Yevrobis-Ahrobiznes Kyiv, Kolos Kovalivka
 Lviv Oblast: SCC Demnya
 Mykolaiv Oblast (2): MFC Pervomaisk, Torpedo Mykolaiv
 Odesa Oblast: Balkany Zorya
 Rivne Oblast (3): Izotop-RAES Kuznetsovsk, FC Malynsk, ODEK Orzhiv
 Vinnytsia Oblast: FC Vinnytsia
 Zaporizhia Oblast: Tavria-Skif Rozdol 
 Zhytomyr Oblast (2): Avanhard Novohrad-Volynskyi, FC Korosten

Notes

Competition schedule

First qualification round

|}
 Byes (9): Yevrobis-Ahrobiznes Kyiv, Kolos Kovalivka, ODEK Orzhiv, Zorya Biloziria, Myr Hornostayivka, MFC Pervomaisk, Balkany Zorya, Demnia, Torpedo Mykolaiv

Second qualification round

|}

Quarterfinals (1/4)

|}

Semifinals (1/2)

|}

Final

|}

See also
 2014 Ukrainian Football Amateur League
 2014–15 Ukrainian Cup

External links
 2014 Ukrainian Amateur Cup at the Footpass (Football Federation of Ukraine)
 Competition bracket. www.aafu.org.ua

Ukrainian Amateur Cup
Ukrainian Amateur Cup
Amateur Cup